The Mystery of the Burnt Cottage is the first in the series of children's novels the Five Find-Outers by Enid Blyton. It was first published in 1943 and continues to be frequently reissued.

Plot summary
The novel centres on the mystery of who could have set fire to Mr Hick’s cottage. The five children, Larry and Daisy Daykin, Pip and Bets Hilton, and newcomer Frederick Algernon Trotteville (later nicknamed Fatty from his initials), meet at the scene of the fire and end up solving the mystery together.

Their suspects include an old tramp, a dismissed servant, a hostile colleague, and the cook. They find certain clues: Broken-down nettles in a ditch, a footprint in a grassy field, and Hawker Tempest planes (which Mr. Hick mentions "flew over" the other day).

The children realise that as Mr Hick claims to have been in the London train when the cottage was burnt, but by his own report he saw the planes which flew over the village at the same time, he is contradicting himself. Fatty finds out that the cottage and the burnt papers Mr Hick describes as 'most important' were insured. The children deduce that Mr Hick burnt his own cottage for the insurance money. The book also introduces Inspector Jenks, who turns out to help the children and becomes a good friend of theirs.

Characters
Mrs. Minns - The housekeeper of Mr. Hick, who suffers from rheumatism
Clear-Orf (Mr. Goon) - The policeman of Peterswood
Mr. Horace Peeks - A former employee of Mr. Hicks, sacked for wearing Mr Hick's clothes while Mr Hick was out and a suspect of burning down the cottage
Mr. Smellie - A learned scholar and former friend of Mr. Hick's. Also a suspect. Is obsessed with papers and documents like Mr Hick
Miss Miggle - A kindly and gentle employee of Mr. Smellie
Hannah  - The sister of Mrs. Minns who smells the fire before Mrs Minns even notices it
Lily - An employee of Mr. Hick's and also reveals to be secretly dating Horace Peeks, as her father will not allow her to even walk with him
Inspector Jenks - A good friend of the Five Find-Outers and an inspector of police, always making Mr Goon nervous even though he is an extremely cheerful, kind and gentle man
Mrs. Hilton - Pip and Bets' strict mother
Mr.Hick 
The Five-Find Outers

References

External links
 
Enid Blyton Society page
Summary and review of The Mystery of the Burnt Cottage

1943 British novels
Novels by Enid Blyton
Methuen Publishing books
1943 children's books